Bilje may refer to:

 Bilje, Croatia, a village in the Osijek-Baranja County
 Bilje, Slovenia, a village in the Municipality of Miren-Kostanjevica